A light aircraft is an aircraft that has a maximum gross takeoff weight of  or less.

Light aircraft are used as utility aircraft commercially for passenger and freight transport, sightseeing, photography, and other roles, as well as personal use.

Examples of aircraft that are at the maximum gross takeoff weight for this category include the de Havilland Canada DHC-6 Twin Otter and Beechcraft B200 Super King Air.

Uses
Uses include aerial surveying, such as monitoring pipelines, light cargo operations, such as "feeding" cargo hubs, and passenger operations. Light aircraft are used for marketing purposes, such as banner towing and skywriting, and flight instruction. The majority of personal aircraft are light aircraft, the most popular in history being the Cessna 172, and most popular in modern history being the Cirrus SR22 and Robinson R44. Larger light aircraft, such as twin turboprops and very light jets, are often used as business aircraft. Most floatplanes also fall into the category of light aircraft.

See also
Aviation safety
General aviation
Large aircraft, those over  MTOW
Light-sport aircraft
List of current production certified light aircraft
Ultralight aviation

References

Light aircraft